Grunt Records was a vanity label founded in 1971 by Jefferson Airplane and distributed by RCA Records.  Initially created to sign local Bay Area acts, the label later was used only for Jefferson Starship and Hot Tuna releases.  The label ended use in 1987 after Grace Slick left Starship.

History
Grunt Records was formed in 1970 when Jefferson Airplane renegotiated their contract with RCA Records.  Initially, Paul Kantner, Grace Slick, Jorma Kaukonen, Jack Casady, and Bill Thompson were responsible for managing.  The name was inspired by a working title for the Volunteers album, "Squat on My Grunt." The first artists signed to the label were Jefferson Airplane, Hot Tuna, Peter Kaukonen, Jack Bonus, Papa John Creach, 1, and Richmond Talbott.

Thompson took over management of Grunt in 1973 and signed former Airplane drummer Joey Covington and Jack Traylor to the label.  In 1974, RCA dropped all Grunt artists except for Jefferson Starship and Hot Tuna.  Jorma Kaukonen signed to a solo deal with RCA in 1979, and Hot Tuna released Final Vinyl.  Jefferson Starship and Starship used the label until Grace Slick left the band and joined Jefferson Airplane for a reunion tour and album on Epic Records.

Discography
 FTR-1001 Bark by Jefferson Airplane
 FTR-1002 Sunfighter by Paul Kantner and Grace Slick
 FTR-1003 Papa John Creach by Papa John Creach
 FTR-1004 Burgers by Hot Tuna
 FTR-1005 Jack Bonus by Jack Bonus
 FTR-1006 Black Kangaroo by Peter Kaukonen
 FTR-1007 Long John Silver by Jefferson Airplane
 FTR-1008 Come by 1
 FTR-1009 Filthy! by Papa John Creach
 BFL1-0147 Thirty Seconds Over Winterland by Jefferson Airplane
 BFL1-0148 Baron von Tollbooth and the Chrome Nun by Paul Kantner, Grace Slick, and David Freiberg
 BFL1-0149 Fat Fandango by Joe E. Covington
 BFL1-0194 Child of Nature by Jack Traylor and Steelwind
 BFL1-0209 Quah by Jorma Kaukonen
 BFL1-0347 Manhole by Grace Slick
 BFL1-0348 The Phosphorescent Rat by Hot Tuna
 BFL1-0418 Playing My Fiddle for You by Papa John Creach
 CYL1-0437 Early Flight by Jefferson Airplane
 BFL1-0717 Dragon Fly by Grace Slick, Paul Kantner, and Jefferson Starship
 BFL1-0820 America's Choice by Hot Tuna
 BFL1-0999 Red Octopus by Jefferson Starship
 BFL1-1238 Yellow Fever by Hot Tuna
 CYL2-1255 Flight Log by Jefferson Airplane
 BFL1-1557 Spitfire by Jefferson Starship
 BFL1-1920 Hoppkorv by Hot Tuna
 BXL1-2515 Earth by Jefferson Starship
 CYL2-2545 Double Dose by Hot Tuna
 DJL1-2852 The Last Interview? by Hot Tuna
 BZL1-3247 Gold by Jefferson Starship
 BXL1-3357 Final Vinyl by Hot Tuna
 BZL1-3452 Freedom at Point Zero by Jefferson Starship
 BZL1-3848 Modern Times by Jefferson Starship
 BXL1-4372 Winds of Change by Jefferson Starship
 BXL1-4921 Nuclear Furniture by Jefferson Starship
 BXL1-5488 Knee Deep in the Hoopla by Starship
 6413-R No Protection by Starship

Reissues
 BXL1-2591 Reissue of Burgers by Hot Tuna
 CYL1-3363 Picture Disc Reissue of Gold by Jefferson Starship
 AYL1-3660 Reissue of Red Octopus by Jefferson Starship
 AYL1-3747 Reissue of Quah by Jorma Kaukonen
 AYL1-3796 Reissue of Dragon Fly by Grace Slick, Paul Kantner, and Jefferson Starship
 AYL1-3799 Reissue of Baron von Tollbooth and the Chrome Nun by Paul Kantner, Grace Slick, and David Freiberg
 AYL1-3951 Reissue of Burgers by Hot Tuna
 AYL1-3953 Reissue of Spitfire by Jefferson Starship
 AYL1-4172 Reissue of Earth by Jefferson Starship
 AYL1-4385 Reissue of Sunfighter by Paul Kantner and Grace Slick
 AYL1-4386 Reissue of Bark by Jefferson Airplane
 AYL1-4391 Reissue of Thirty Seconds Over Winterland by Jefferson Airplane
 AYL1-5161 Reissue of Freedom at Point Zero by Jefferson Starship

Unissued
 FTR-1010 Gettin' Plenty by Richmond Talbott

References

External links

1971 establishments in California
1987 disestablishments in California
American record labels
Jefferson Airplane
Pop record labels
RCA Records
Record labels established in 1971
Record labels disestablished in 1987
Rock record labels
Vanity record labels